Prichtovsky is a rural locality (a khutor) in Pobedenskoye Rural Settlement of Maykopsky District, Russia. The population was 415 as of 2018. There are 11 streets.

Geography 
Prichtovsky is located 8 km northwest of Tulsky (the district's administrative centre) by road. Shaumyan is the nearest rural locality.

References 

Rural localities in Maykopsky District